The Yukon Real Estate Association (YREA) represents the approximately 40 real estate brokers and salespeople who are members of Yukon's 4 member firms.

History
 1977 - founded

See also
 Canadian Real Estate Association
 Multiple Listing Service

External links
 Yukon Real Estate Association
 Yukon Government, Department of Community Services - responsible for licensing of real estate agents and sales persons
 Real Estate Agents Act

References

Real estate industry trade groups based in Canada
1977 establishments in Canada
Economy of Yukon